The men's halfpipe competition of the Vancouver 2010 Olympics was held at Cypress Mountain on February 17, 2010.

Summary
In each round of competition, each competitor performed two rides through the halfpipe.  The highest-scoring run determined whether or not the competitor continued to the next round (or medaled, in the final round).  In each round (except for the first run of the qualifying round) the order of performance was based on the inverse order of scoring (i.e., the competitor with the lowest score went first and so forth with the highest-scoring competitor going last).

The first round was the qualifying round, with 40 snowboarders divided into two heats.  The top nine scorers from each heat advanced; the top three scorers went straight to the final round while the fourth- through ninth-place scorers went to a semifinal round.

The semifinal round consisted of twelve snowboarders. The top six from that group joined the six top scorers from the qualifying round for the finals.

In the final round, Shaun White had already wrapped up the gold medal performance with his first run (none of the other competitors' second-run scores exceeded White's 46.8 score), but performed his second run anyway, successfully completing a double McTwist 1260 and improving on his initial score.

It is currently the only Olympic halfpipe final to take place at night.

Results

Qualification

Semifinal

Final

External links
2010 Winter Olympics results: Men's Halfpipe (qual), from http://www.vancouver2010.com/; retrieved 2010-02-16.
2010 Winter Olympics results: Men's Halfpipe (semifinals), from http://www.vancouver2010.com/; retrieved 2010-02-16.
2010 Winter Olympics results: Men's Halfpipe (finals), from http://www.vancouver2010.com/; retrieved 2010-02-16.

Snowboarding at the 2010 Winter Olympics
Men's events at the 2010 Winter Olympics